The 1927 Czechoslovak presidential election took place on 27 May 1927. Tomáš Garrigue Masaryk was elected for his third term. His main rival was Communist Václav Šturc.

Background
Tomáš Garrigue Masaryk was president of Czechoslovakia since 1918. His second term concluded in 1927. He decided seek another term but stated that he won't participate in the second round if he isn't elected during the first. Republican Party of Farmers and Peasants nominated Antonín Švehla who became the strongest Masaryk's competitor. Communist Party of Czechoslovakia nominated Václav Šturc. Masaryk's reelection became uncertain as he would have withdrawn from election if he isn't elected in the first round.

Procedure
President was elected by bicameral parliament that consisted of 300 Deputies and 150 Senators. Candidate needed 60% of votes to be elected.

Voting

Švehla withdrawn from election before the voting started. Šturc was Masaryk's only rival. 286 Deputies and 148 Senators participated in the election. 432 votes were submitted. Masaryk received 274 and was narrowly elected.

References

Presidential
1927